Tor Ole Skullerud (born 10 December 1970) is a Norwegian football manager and former player.

Club career
Skullerud was born Kongsvinger, Norway. He played for hometown club Kongsvinger IL, before turning out for Ready, Frigg, Grue IL, and Ullern IF Fotball.

Managerial career

Early career
Skullerud worked as a coach in Ullern IF Fotball and Bærum SK before taking over Norway's U-18 and U-19 teams. He was then appointed as assistant manager for Vålerenga, working under playing manager Martin Andresen.

Norway national youth teams
After being Per Joar Hansen's assistant in the under-21s, he took over as head coach in January 2013 after Hansen was appointed the new manager of Rosenborg.

He led Norway to the UEFA European Under-21 Championship in Israel. Norway was one of eight participating teams and finished second in their round with five points after a draw against the host nation Israel, a win against England and a draw with Italy. In the knockout phase, they faced eventual winners Spain, losing 3–0.

Skullerud was also briefly assistant coach under Per Mathias Høgmo with the men's national team. Skullerud is also a UEFA Prolis which is the highest education of coaches in Norway.

Molde
On 13 January 2014, he was presented as Ole Gunnar Solskjær's successor as head coach of Molde FK. His first season with Molde was an instant success, winning the double as winners of both the league title and the Norwegian Cup, the club's first ever double. Molde won the league with an eleven-point gap down to main rivals Rosenborg, and their 71 points was a new record for most points in the league. On 1 July 2015, Molde announced that Skullerud had decided not to continue as head coach at Molde after the 2015 season due to family reasons. After a run of mediocre results, culminating with Molde being eliminated by Dinamo Zagreb in the third qualifying round for the 2015–16 UEFA Champions League on 4 August, Skullerud was sacked on 6 August 2015.

Managerial statistics

Honours

Manager
Molde
Eliteserien: 2014
Norwegian Cup: 2014

Individual
Eliteserien Manager of the Year: 2014

References 

1970 births
Living people
Sportspeople from Kongsvinger
Norwegian footballers
Norwegian football managers
Molde FK managers
Strømsgodset Toppfotball managers
Eliteserien managers
Association footballers not categorized by position